The Ivanovo State University of Chemistry and Technology or ISUCT is a public university located in Ivanovo, the administrative center of Ivanovo Oblast, Russia. Research priorities of the ISUCT are concentrated in chemical technology, chemistry and engineering.

The ISUCT takes the first place among universities in the Ivanovo region in the national ranking of universities.

History 
It was founded in 1918 as Chemical Faculty of Ivanovo-Vosnesensk Polytechnic Institute. In 1930, Ivanovo-Vosnessensk Polytechnic Institute was split into four independent schools: Ivanovo Textile Institute, Ivanovo Power Institute, Civil Engineering Institute, and Ivanovo Institute of Chemistry and Technology (ICTI). The latter gained a new status in 1992 and was renamed to Ivanovo State Academy of Chemistry and Technology, and in 1998 it was renamed again, becoming Ivanovo State University of Chemistry and Technology.

Education 
The ISUCT has a multi-level system of higher education: bachelor – 4 years, master – 2 years, post-graduate – 3–4 years, pre-university programs for foreign students – 1 year. ISUCT provides high-quality training in a wide range of engineering, technological, and natural sciences directions.

Today ISUCT is a team of highly qualified academic and research staff, including honored workers of science, of education and culture, laureates of state and government awards, honorary doctors and professors from leading European universities, honorary workers of higher professional education of the Russian Federation.

Campus 
The university is located in seven buildings:

 The main building ("Г"). The building was built in 1930 by the project of academician Fomin. It is an architectural monument.
 The building "A". This is a classroom building and it was built in the 1930s.
 The building "Б". This is a circular building. It contains large auditoriums and the library. It was built in the 1970s. The building has an unofficial name "Банка" ("Banka", English: jar).
 The building "В". The building has an unofficial name "высотка" ("visotka", English: high-rise building). It was built in the 1970s.
 The Humanitarian building ("К"). This was built in 1930 as a student dormitory. It completely renovated in 2009.
 The building "Д". The new academic building has been open since 2016.
 The building "И".

The university has 4 student hostels in a close proximity to the university buildings, a health and resort center, a country sport camp, cafes and canteens in all university buildings.

Student life 
The university hosts a large number of events weekly. The most famous traditional student events are celebrations of Chemist's Day, concerts of Student Club, scientific conference "Fundamental Sciences for a Specialist of the New Century", etc.

The ISUCT offers students to realize their opportunities. The following organizations work at the university:

 Student Club 

An association of talented ISUCT students, including dance groups, folklore ensembles, vocal groups, student theater, KVN (a comedy competition) team, etc. The Student Club was many times the winner of the regional amateur performances festival "The Students' Spring" and thus became a real leader among other higher schools of Ivanovo.

Student Trade Union Organization
Student Government
Sports Club

Numerous sport groups are very popular at the University. The students take part in various intramural and extramural sport events and often become their winners. Women's basketball team is a twice Student Basketball Association champion (2011/2012, 2013/2014).

International Club
 Art association "Sheremetev Centre"

It carries out versatile esthetic education of the students and directs a varied programme of entertainment, visiting speakers, social and cultural events, discussion clubs, etc.

Research 
Over the years of its existence the ISUCT has turned into a major center of fundamental and applied science. This was primarily promoted by the traditions laid down in different years by the founders of scientific schools and directions: N.N. Vorozhtsov, Ya.K. Syrkin, P.P. Budnikov, E.A. Shilov, K.B. Yatsimirsky, G.A. Krestov, V.P. Vasiliev, A.A. Spryskov, P.V. Moryganov, B.N. Melnikov, V.F. Borodkin, R.P. Smirnov, K.S. Krasnov, V.N. Kiselnikov, V.A. Shormanov, E.M. Rumyantsev, V.G. Melnikov and others. Today their scientific ideas are being continued and developed by leading scientists of the university, including honored scientists of the Russian Federation, honoured workers of the higher school of the Russian Federation, laureates of the prize of the President of the Russian Federation and the Government of the Russian Federation.

The ISUCT pays great attention to the development of youth research projects. In 2019, the ISUCT has received more than 30 patents for inventions and won over 20 grants. Young scientists of the ISUCT regularly win all-Russian and international competitions. In 2019, representatives of the university received one-twentieth of all scholarships of the President of Russia to study abroad.

Scientific infrastructure 
The scientific infrastructure of ISUCT contains:
Testing and analytical centres (Center for collective use of research equipment, Testing center "Quality", Center for certification of goods and equipment "RegionTest")
 Research Facilities (Institute of Macroheterocyclic Compounds Chemistry, Institute of Thermodynamics and Kinetics of Chemical Processes)
R & D and innovation centres (Research and Production Laboratory "Ion-plasma technological processes", RPL "Technology of processing of rubber-bituminous materials", Research and Production Enterprise "Synthesis", Production site "Complex", Educational, Research and Production Centre "Nail", Research and Production Centre "Potential", Research and Production Laboratory "Chlorine")
Scientific and Educational Centres ("Nanotechnologies", "Theoretical and Experimental Chemistry", Institute for the Development of Digital Economics, Centre for Innovative and Anti-crisis Technologies, SEC for Information, Linguistic and Educational Technologies, Practice-oriented Scientific and Engineering  Club "Innovation", Research and Project Centre after A.A. Tarkovsky, Workshop of Contemporary Art "The Sixth Floor")

Scientific journals 
The ISUCT publishes five scientific journals, three of which are included in the international scientific citation databases Web of Science and Scopus. All of them are included in the List of peer-reviewed scientific publications, in which the main scientific results of dissertations for the degree of candidate and doctor of science should be published.

Izvestia Vuzov. Series: Khimia i Khimicheskaya Tekhnologia (Russian Journal of Chemistry and Chemical Technology) 
This journal is the oldest scientific journal published at ISUCT: in 2018 it celebrated its 60th anniversary. The founder and the first chief editor was Professor K.B. Yatsimirsky. A specific feature of the journal is its wide profile which allows one to represent materials on chemistry and chemical technology in Russian and in English. Periodicity is 12 issues per year.

Macroheterocycles 
The journal Macroheterocycles has been published at ISUCT since 2008 on the initiative of a Corresponding Member of the Russian Academy of Sciences, Doctor of Chemistry O.I. Koifman. The journal Macroheterocycles is a forum of the specialists studying macroheterocyclic compounds. It publishes original experimental and theoretical works (full papers and brief reports) and reviews on the synthesis, structure, physical and coordination chemistry of macroheterocycles as well as  on their practical application.

Russian Chemical Journal. Journal of the Russian Chemical Society after D.I. Mendeleev 
The journal publishes analytical reviews devoted to the problems of chemical science, technology and education, original papers and brief reports. Most issues of the journal are thematic and are devoted to a specific area of science or technology.

The Journal of the Russian Chemical Society was founded in 1869. The first editor was a Russian chemist, professor at the Imperial St. Petersburg University, corresponding member of St. Petersburg Academy of Sciences N.A. Menshutkin (1842–1907).

In 1956 the journal was renamed. The All-Union Chemical Society established the Journal of the All-Union Chemical Society named after D.I. Mendeleev edited by Academician of the Academy of Sciences of the USSR, Doctor of Chemistry I.L. Knunyants. The journal was published in Moscow in the printing house of the "Goskhimizdat" (State Chemistry Publishing Office). In 1992, after the collapse of the USSR, the All-Union Chemical Society (ACS) ceased to exist, and since 1993 its edition was renamed to Russian Chemical Journal. Until 2013 the journal was published in Moscow and was edited by Academician of the RAS Yu.D. Tretyakov (until 2012) and Doctor of Chemistry, Professor of Moscow State University G.V. Lisichkin (2013). In 2013 the rights for the publication of the Russian Chemical Journal were transferred to the Ivanovo State University of Chemistry and Technology.

Modern High Technologies 
Regional supplement to the journal of the Russian Academy of Natural Sciences Modern high technologies.

Izvestia Vuzov. Series: Economika, finansy i upravlenie proizvodstvom (Series "Economics, Finance and Production Management")

International activity 
The ISUCT handles foreign students since early 1950th due to either intergovernmental agreements or direct contracts. More than 4000 students study at the University. Number of foreign students is more than 200. Students from different countries studied at the university at different times. These are citizens of Angola, Belarus, China, Congo, Mongolia, Tajikistan, Turkmenistan, Ukraine, Uzbekistan, Vietnam, etc. ISUCT is developing broad international contacts with universities and educational institutions of many countries of the world including Poland, Germany, Italy, Spain, China, Uzbekistan and others.

Faculties and departments

Faculty of Inorganic Chemistry and Technology 
Inorganic Chemistry Department

Department of Analytical Chemistry

Physical and Colloidal Chemistry Department

Electrocemical Production Technology Department

Department of General Chemical Technology

Department of Industrial Ecology

Department of Technology of Ceramics and Nanomaterials

Department of Technology of Electronic Materials and Devices

Department of Technology of Inorganic Substances

Faculty of Organic Chemistry and Technology 
Organic Chemistry Department

Department of Food Technology and Biotechnology

Department of Chemistry and Technology of Higher Molecular Compounds

Fine Organic Synthesis Technology Department

Department of Chemical Technology of Fibrous Materials

Faculty of Engineering, Management and Digital Infrastructure 
The Department of Processes and Apparatus of Chemical Engineering

Department of Technological Machinery and Equipment

The Department of Engineering Cybernetics and Automation

The Department of Information Technology and Digital Economy

Faculty of Fundamental and Applied Chemistry

Faculty of Part-time Education

Transport connections 

 Bus: 2, 12, 14, 20, 24, 32, 33, 35, 45, 120
 Trolleybus: 2, 6, 9, 11
 Marshrutka: 2, 17, 24, 25, 30, 30б, 37, 38, 39, 131, 135

See also

Ivanovo

References

External links
Official website  

Universities in Ivanovo Oblast
Educational institutions established in 1918
Ivanovo
1918 establishments in Russia
Technical universities and colleges in Russia
Objects of cultural heritage of Russia of federal significance
Cultural heritage monuments in Ivanovo Oblast